Shir Savar (also Romanized as Shīr Savār) is a village in Gatab-e Shomali Rural District, Gatab District, Babol County, Mazandaran Province, Iran. At the 2006 census, its population was 995, in 227 families.

References 

Populated places in Babol County